Archernis dolopsalis is a moth in the family Crambidae. It was described by Francis Walker in 1859. It is found on Borneo, Mysol and in southern India, Sri Lanka and Burma.

References

Moths described in 1859
Spilomelinae
Moths of Asia